Edward Bulwer Lytton Dickens (13 March 1852 – 23 January 1902) was the youngest son of English novelist Charles Dickens and his wife Catherine. He emigrated to Australia at the age of 16, and eventually entered politics, serving as a member of the New South Wales Legislative Assembly from 1889 to 1894. He died in poverty at the age of 49.

Early life
Nicknamed "Plorn", Dickens was named after novelist Edward Bulwer-Lytton and educated at Tunbridge Wells in Kent at a private school owned by the Reverend W. C. Sawyer, later Anglican bishop of Armidale and Grafton.  He also attended lectures at the Royal Agricultural College in Cirencester, Gloucestershire.

Move to Australia
Charles Dickens encouraged Edward, along with his elder brother Alfred D'Orsay Tennyson Dickens, to migrate to Australia, which he saw as a land of opportunity.  Alfred migrated in 1865 and Edward in 1868. Edward arrived at Momba Station just before his sixteenth birthday. Dickens settled at Wilcannia, New South Wales, where he became manager of Mount Murchison Station (part of Momba). He married Constance Desailly, the daughter of a local property owner, in 1880. He opened a stock and station agency, was elected as an alderman of Bourke Shire Council and bought a share in Yanda station near Bourke. He lost heavily from bad seasons and in 1886 was appointed government inspector of runs in the Bourke District.  He was never able to pay back a loan of £800 from his most successful brother, Henry.

Parliament
Dickens nominated for the seat of Wentworth at the 1882 by-election, but withdrew before the polls, won by fellow pastoralist Edward Quin. He was then elected member for Wilcannia in the New South Wales Legislative Assembly in 1889 and held the seat until he was defeated by Labor Party candidate Richard Sleath in 1894.

Later life

Dickens then became a rabbit inspector for the Government of New South Wales, then an officer for the Lands Department in charge of the Moree district. He subsequently had difficulty finding employment and died after several months' illness in Moree, in debt and childless. He was buried in Moree Cemetery.

See also
 Dickens family

Notes

Members of the New South Wales Legislative Assembly
1852 births
1902 deaths
Charles Dickens
Australian stock and station agents
19th-century Australian businesspeople